Reguły  is a village in the administrative district of Gmina Michałowice, within Pruszków County, Masovian Voivodeship, in east-central Poland.

The village has a population of 1,000.

References

Villages in Pruszków County